Elusa binocula is a species of moth of the family Noctuidae. It was described by George Hampson in 1911, and is known from New Guinea.

References

Moths described in 1911
Hadeninae
Moths of New Guinea